Namsaling is a town and Village Development Committee  in Ilam District in the Province No. 1 of eastern Nepal. At the time of the 1991 Nepal census it had a population of 4,978 persons living in 905 individual households.

This VDC is situated in the middle east part of the district.

References

External links
UN map of the municipalities of Ilam District

Populated places in Ilam District